Doom VI – Illegal Soul is the fifth studio album by the Japanese band Doom.

Track listing

 I'm Real - 5:13	
 Deliver Me From Reasons Why? - 6:27	
 Blood on the Rise - 5:50	
  (instrumental) - 3:10	
 Those Who Race Toward Death - 6:40	
 Can't Turn Back!!? - 4:52	
 We Shall Miss Nothing (Killing Field II) - 6:43	
 Gotta Love Yourself!	- 4:09	
 Dead Soul - 3:18

External links
Doom @ Encyclopaedia Metallum
Doom VI - Illegal Soul @ Encyclopaedia Metallum
The Doom FAQ

1992 albums
Doom (Japanese band) albums